The Japanese soldierfish  (Ostichthys japonicus), known also as brocade perch, is a soldierfish species belonging to the  family Holocentridae.

It is found in the West Pacific, from southern Japan to the Andaman Islands, and near Australia. It is also known from Fiji and Tuvalu.

In Japan, it is known as ebisu dai (恵比寿 鯛).

References

External links

Ostichthys
Fish described in 1862